The 2008–09 Atlanta Thrashers season was the tenth season of the franchise in the National Hockey League (NHL). The Thrashers attempted to make the Stanley Cup playoffs for the first time since the 2006–07 season, but failed.

Regular season

Divisional standings

Conference standings

Schedule and results 
 Green background indicates win (2 points).
 Red background indicates regulation loss (0 points).
 White background indicates overtime/shootout loss (1 point).

Record vs. Opponents 

Notes: * denotes division winner; teams in bold are in the Southeast Division; teams in italics qualified for the playoffs; points refer to the points achieved by the team whom the Thrashers played against

 = Member of the Atlantic Division  = Member of the Northeast Division  = Member of the Southeast Division  = Member of the Central Division  = Member of the Northeast Division  = Member of the Pacific Division

Playoffs 
The Atlanta Thrashers failed to qualify for the 2009 NHL Playoffs.

Player statistics

Skaters

Goaltenders 

†Denotes player spent time with another team before joining Thrashers. Stats reflect season totals.
‡Traded mid-season
underline/italics denotes franchise record

Awards and records

Milestones

Transactions

Trades

Free agents

Claimed from waivers

Draft picks 
Atlanta's picks at the 2008 NHL Entry Draft in Ottawa, Ontario.

See also 
 2008–09 NHL season

References 

Atlanta Thrashers seasons
A
A
Atlanta Thrashers
Atlanta Thrashers